Veiled Ambition is a 1-part documentary created by Rebel Films for the SBS independent network following a Lebanese-Australian woman named Frida as she opens a shop selling fashionable clothing for Muslim women on Melbourne's Sydney Road.

The documentary follows Frida, described as a "little aussie battler in a scarf" as she develops her business in Melbourne while juggling a husband and home in Sydney and a pregnancy.

A down-turn in sales after police raids on Muslim homes in Sydney and Melbourne induces Frida to stage a fashion show at the Australian Bridal Expo in order to gain greater exposure, a month before she is due to give birth.

Veiled Ambition won the Palace Films Award for Short Film Promoting Human Rights at the 2006 Melbourne International Film Festival.

References

External links
 
Veiled Ambition Study Guide

Documentary films about businesspeople
Australian short documentary films
2007 short documentary films
2007 Australian television series debuts
Documentary films about Islam
Documentary films about women
Islam in Australia
2000s Australian films